The Great Burrito Extortion Case is the sixth studio album by American rock band Bowling for Soup.

Background
According to the band on their official website "there are at least 12 verses' worth of total joy for every sort-of-sad chorus about an ex-girlfriend on this record."

Release
In June and July, the band went on tour with Flashlight Brown.

This album's first single to be released was "High School Never Ends", which is available on iTunes. It was released on November 7, 2006, through Jive Records. It was originally set to be titled All My Rowdy Friends Are Still Intoxicated or We're Not Fat, We Just Have Small Heads. The album's title originated from the news ticker on the bottom of a TV screen that the group saw when in a hotel bar.  The headline said "Burrito Extortion Case," which intrigued the band members.

In July and August 2007, the group went on tour with Mêlée, Quietdrive and Army of Freshmen. They toured Australia in April 2008 with Pennywise, Sum 41, and the Vandals.

Reception

AllMusic senior editor Stephen Thomas Erlewine said that the record was "still proudly goofy, poppy punk, stuff that's fun without quite being memorable", but found the band's humor outdated with its '80s pop culture references, saying their "pandering a little bit, trying to deliver what they believe today's teens want," concluding that "even when they're coming across like Gen-X cranks, they're still nimble and melodic, so it's easy enough to listen to The Great Burrito Extortion Case and enjoy it – it sure is hard to get worked up about it, though." Gary Susman from Entertainment Weekly said the album "starts out fun but turns self-indulgent", concluding with, "Still, at least two tunes will lodge forever in your skull. One day, you’ll recall them fondly, and BFS, trafficking in insta-nostalgia, will be there to write a catchy number about that feeling." Rolling Stones Christian Hoard said that "between the we're-happy-to-be-happy "I'm Gay" and the laudatory "Val Kilmer," the dozens of not really clever jokes about crazy girls and John Mellencamp, and whined harmonies and chug-a-chug guitars that blend together, the songs wear out their charm with a quickness."

The album got an 'Honorable Mention' on Ultimate-Guitar's top ten albums of 2006, and debuted at number 88 on the Billboard 200.

Track listing

Bonus tracks

Many of the bonus tracks were released in 2008 on the Japanese 2008 Re-Issue of Bowling for Soup Goes to the Movies.

B-sides

Credits

 Jaret Reddick — lead vocals, rhythm guitar
 Erik Chandler — bass, vocals
 Chris Burney — lead guitar, vocals
 Gary Wiseman — drums
 Produced by Russ-T Cobb. and Jaret Reddick except track 11 Produced by Butch Walker and track 2 Produced by Russ-T. Cobb and Jaret Reddick, Additional Production by Adam Schlesinger
 Recorded May 15 to June 14, 2006 at Ruby Red Productions, Atlanta, GA, Pulse Recording, Silverlake, CA and Rosewater Studios, Tulsa, Ok
 Engineered and Mixed by Russ-T Cobb Additional Engineering by Casey Diiorio
 Mixed at Ruby Red Productions, Atlanta, GA except * and **
 Assistant Engineers: Sean Loughlin and James Salter
 * Recorded and Engineered by Karl Egsieker at Pulse Recording, Silverlake, CA
 Strings Arranged and Conducted by Rob Mathes
 Recorded by Mark Mandelbaum Assisted by Alex Veneguer at Legacy Recording Studios, NYC
 ** Mixed by Tom Lord-Alge at South Beach Studios, Miami, FL
 Album mastered by Howie Weinberg at Masterdisk, NYC

Additional musicians/backing vocals and all around swell dudes:
 Russ-T Cobb — "Make Mine a Decaf," "So ugh...you got my money"
 Casey Diiorio — "Someone drank my birthday present," "That's what happens man"
 Zac Maloy — "you guys aren't going to be seeing much of me for the rest of the week," "pretty, pretty good!!!"
 Butch Walker — Guitar, Keyboards, and Percussion on "When We Die"
 Adam Schlesinger – Guitar and Vocals on "High School Never Ends"
 Joey Huffman – Additional Organ, Piano and Moog
 Lesley Roy sang her BUTT off (literally) on "Much More Beautiful Person" The "When We Die" Orchestra: Rob Mathes (Piano), Sandra Park, Tomas K. Carney, Michael Casteel, Vivek Kamath, Shmuel Katz, Lisa E. Kim, Maria Kitsopoulos, Elizabeth Lim-Dutton, Suzanne Ornstein, Larua J. Seaton, Sarah J. Seiver, Sharon H. Yamada, Jung Sun Yoo, Rebecca H. Young
 Various gang vocals, whistling, drinking, laughing, poking and prodding in Tulsa, Oklahoma:
Greg Lobdell, Neal Tiemann, BRANDO, Bryan Jewett, Andy Skib, Alexis "Lyndsay" Skib, Josh Center, Davey Danger

 Chicks that sing on "Friends Like You" and made the room NOT smell like boy:
Nikki Messing, Niki Smith, Kira Von Sutra, Lindsey Campbell, April Farmer

Bowling for Soup crew:
 Greg Lobdell – Drum Technologist, Monitors and the Chiefs
 Edo Levi – Front of House, Stage Manager, DJ and the Star of David
 Sean Bailey – Tour Manager, One Liners and Bus Pooper
 Bobby-Wayne – Guitar Tech, Bass Tech and Beelzebub
 Dave "Mrs. Garrett" Hale – Merch, Taker Upper of Slack, Anxiety and Lifetime
 A&R: Pablo Mathiason
 Management: Mike Swinford, Paul Nugent and Randy Miller at Rainmaker Artists
 Booking: Andy Somers for The Agency Group/Paul Bolton from Helter Skelter (UK/Europe)
 Legal: Michael L. McKoy, Esq., for Serling Rooks and Ferrara

Release history

Notes
A  Featured in frontman Jaret Reddick's second Bowling for Soup podcast, released November 30, 2009.
B  Featured in frontman Jaret Reddick's third Bowling for Soup podcast, released December 16, 2009.
C  Featured in frontman Jaret Reddick's fourth Bowling for Soup podcast, released January 7, 2010.
D  Featured in frontman Jaret Reddick's seventh Bowling for Soup podcast, released March 10, 2010.

References

External links

The Great Burrito Extortion Case at YouTube (streamed copy where licensed)
Ultimate Guitar's Top Ten Albums of 2006. "The Great Burrito Extortion Case" gained an Honorable Mention.

2006 albums
Bowling for Soup albums
Jive Records albums
Albums produced by Butch Walker